Vincent Lemire (born 1973) is a French historian.

In 1998 Lemire obtained the Agrégation for History.
He received his doctorate in 2006 with his work La Soif de Jerusalem (lit. "The Thirst of Jerusalem"), which was published as a book in 2011.
His book Jerusalem 1900, published in 2013, was translated into several languages.
Lemire works as lecturer at the University of Paris-Est Marne-la-Vallée and director of the European Open Jerusalem project, funded by the European Research Council.

Lemire's research topics are the History of the Middle East, in particular Jerusalem and its Moroccan Quarter, and the history of the French slums from the 1930s to the 1970s.
He also deals with the History of photography.

Awards 
In 2013 Lemire was awarded the Prix Augustin Thierry for his book Jérusalem 1900. La ville sainte à l'âge des possibles.
Lemire, Katell Berthelot, Julien Loiseau and Yann Potin received the Prix Pierre Lafue and the Prix Sophie Barluet for their book Jérusalem, Histoire d’une ville-monde, des origines à nos jours in 2017.

Publications 
 Jérusalem 1900. La ville sainte à l’âge des possibles, Points, 2016, this book has been translated into English, Arabic, Hebrew and Chinese
 Jerusalem, histoire d'une ville-monde des origines a nos jours: Histoire d'une ville-monde, des origines à nos jours, Editions Flammarion, 2016,  (French)
 Révolutions - Quand les peuples font l'histoire, BELIN, 2017, with Mathilde Larrère, Félix Chartreux, Maud Chirio, Eugénia Paleraki (French)
 La Soif de Jérusalem: Essai d’hydrohistoire (1840–1948), Éditions de la Sorbonne, 2011,  download, pdf (French)
 Across the Archives: New Sources on the Ethiopian Christian Community in Jerusalem, 1840–1940, with Stéphane Ancel, in Jerusalem Quarterly, Vol 71, 2017 online, pdf
 Ouvrir les archives d’une ville fermée?, université Paris-Est, Marne-la-Vallée, 2015, online, pdf
 Publishing Jerusalem's Ottoman Municipal Archives (1892–1917): A Turning Point for the City's Historiography, with Yasemin Avci und Falestin Naili, in Jerusalem Quarterly, Vol 60, 2014 online, pdf
 The Awakening of Palestinian Hydropolitical Consciousness: The Artas- Jerusalem Water Conflict of 1925, in Jerusalem Quarterly, Vol 48, 2011 online, pdf

External links

References

Living people
1973 births
21st-century French historians